Trictena is a genus of ghost moths in the family Hepialidae. There are at least three described species in Trictena.

Species
These three species belong to the genus Trictena:
 Trictena argyrosticha Turner, 1929
 Trictena atripalpis Walker, 1856
 Trictena barnardi Tindale, 1941

References

Further reading

 

Hepialidae
Articles created by Qbugbot